Philip IV may refer to:

 Philip IV of Macedon (died 297 BC)
 Philip IV of France (1268–1314)
 Philip IV of Burgundy or Philip I of Castile (1478–1506)
 Philip IV, Count of Nassau-Weilburg (1542–1602)
 Philip IV of Spain (1605–1665)

See also
 Walls of Philip IV, a City Walls built by Philip IV of Spain in Madrid